Varu or Voru in Iran may refer to:
 Varu, Kurdistan
 Voru, Razavi Khorasan